James Carlisle Wasson (March 31, 1886 - November 1966) was a Democratic member of the Mississippi House of Representatives, representing Attala County, from 1916 to 1920.

Biography 
James Carlisle Wasson was born on March 31, 1886, in Creek, Attala County, Mississippi. His parents were Newton Copeland Wasson and Mary Jane (Ratliff) Watson. He, along with Icey Day, were elected to represent Attala County in the Mississippi House of Representatives in 1915. He died in November 1966, and was residing in Kosciusko, Mississippi, at that time.

References 

1886 births
1966 deaths
Democratic Party members of the Mississippi House of Representatives
People from Attala County, Mississippi
People from Kosciusko, Mississippi